Greenie may refer to:

 Greenie (Australian bird), an Australian lorikeet
 Greenie (Scottish bird), the European Greenfinch
 The mascot of Isidore Newman School in New Orleans, Louisiana
 The mascot of Christ School in Arden, North Carolina 
 Greenie (drug), a psychostimulant drug of the phenethylamine class
 A common or derogatory term for an environmentalist, a person who supports the goals of the environmental movement
 "The Greenies", an episode of the TV series The Goodies
 La Salle Greenies, the varsity team representing La Salle Green Hills

See also
 Greaney, surname
 Greany Building, a historic building in Fall River, Massachusetts
 Green (disambiguation)
 Wu Tsing-fong, also known as Greeny Wu, lead singer for Sodagreen, a Taiwan indie band